Road to Happiness is a 1942 American film directed by Phil Rosen.

Plot 
A bittersweet story of a family's road to happiness. Jeff Carter (John Boles) has just 
returned from Europe eager to see his family. Charley Grady (Roscoe Karns), his agent,
informs Jeff that his wife, Millie (Mona Barrie) has divorced him and has remarried to a millionaire, Sam Rankin.
Jeff has discovered that his narcissistic ex has sent Danny to military boarding school because
she would rather socialize with her friends.

Danny is glad his father is home from his two-year baritone opera studies and is
happy to live with him again, although they share one room in a boarding house.
Jeff and Danny have no money and Jeff cannot find a singing
job.  He finds a radio job with an acting part as an Indian on a cowboy show.

Danny realizes he is in the way of his fathers dream to sing and tries to push him away,
but admits to his father that he can't lie to him.  His father insists on continuing
to act so that they can spend more time together.

Jeff gets his long-awaited chance ....

Cast 
John Boles as Jeff Carter
Mona Barrie as Millie Rankin
Billy Lee as Danny Carter
Roscoe Karns as Charley Grady
Lillian Elliott as Mrs. Price
Paul Porcasi as Pietro Pacelli
Selmer Jackson as Sam Rankin
Brandon Hurst as Swayne
Sam Flint as Colonel Gregory
Antonio Filauri as Almonti
Harland Tucker as Foster

Soundtrack 
 John Boles - "Danny Boy"
 John Boles - "Vision Fugitive" (aria from Massenet's "Herodiade")
 John Boles - "America"

External links 

1942 films
1942 romantic drama films
American romantic musical films
Monogram Pictures films
American musical drama films
1940s romantic musical films
American romantic drama films
1940s musical drama films
American black-and-white films
Films directed by Phil Rosen
1940s English-language films
1940s American films